Stefan Thomke is the William Barclay Harding Professor of Business Administration at Harvard Business School. 

Thomke joined the technology and operations management division at Harvard Business School in 1995, on completion of his doctoral studies at MIT. Thomke's research is focused on the process, economics, and management of experimentation and testing in the context of innovation management.

Thomke's highly cited research has been published as research articles, case studies and notes extensively in books and leading journals such as California Management Review, Harvard Business Review, Journal of Product Innovation Management, Management Science, Organization Science, Research Policy, Sloan Management Review, Strategic Management Journal and Scientific American.

References

Year of birth missing (living people)
Living people
Harvard Business School faculty
American economists
MIT School of Engineering alumni